Charlie McDonald (September 25, 1932 – March 15, 1984) was an American bobsledder. He competed in the two-man event at the 1964 Winter Olympics.

References

1932 births
1984 deaths
American male bobsledders
Olympic bobsledders of the United States
Bobsledders at the 1964 Winter Olympics
People from Malone, New York